The 1915 Preston by-election was held on 9 June 1915.  The by-election was held due to the incumbent Conservative MP, Alfred Aspinall Tobin, becoming a county court judge.  It was won by the Conservative candidate Urban H. Broughton who was unopposed due to a War-time electoral pact.

References

1915 elections in the United Kingdom
1915 in England
1910s in Lancashire
Elections in Preston
By-elections to the Parliament of the United Kingdom in Lancashire constituencies
Unopposed by-elections to the Parliament of the United Kingdom (need citation)
June 1915 events